Samuel or Sam Allen may refer to:

Samuel Allen (New Hampshire governor) (1635–1705), English proprietor and governor of the Province of New Hampshire
Samuel Clesson Allen (1772–1842), American politician from Massachusetts
Samuel Leeds Allen (1841–1918), American inventor
Samuel Allen (bishop) (1844–1908), English Roman Catholic clergyman
Samuel Allen (baseball) (born 1936), baseball player for the Negro leagues
Samuel Allen (cricketer) (born 1943), Jamaican cricketer
Samuel R. Allen (born c. 1953), American businessman, CEO of John Deere.
Sam Allen (football manager) (1868–1946), English football manager
Sam Allen (musician) (1909–1963), American jazz pianist
Samuel W. Allen (1917–2015), American writer, literary scholar, and lawyer
Samuel Allen (mountaineer), see Valley of the Ten Peaks
Samuel Allen (Captain-Liuetenant in the French and Indian War), see Fort Swatara

See also

Samuel Allan, footballer, see List of Hibernian F.C. players
Samantha Allen (disambiguation), 
Allen (surname)